Alyaksandr Uladzimiravich Kuhan (born 26 May 1991) is a Belarusian professional football player who plays for Mauerwerk.

History
Belarusian midfielder joined Lithuanian A Lyga club Utenis on 6 March 2017. He played 12 times in the league, scoring once in delayed first tour match against Kauno Žalgiris, but was released by the club on 30 June 2017.

References

External links

Alyaksandr Kuhan at ÖFB

1991 births
Living people
Belarusian footballers
Association football midfielders
Belarusian expatriate footballers
Expatriate footballers in Lithuania
Expatriate footballers in Austria
Belarusian expatriate sportspeople in Lithuania
Belarusian Premier League players
A Lyga players
FC Dinamo Minsk players
FC Bereza-2010 players
FC Dnepr Mogilev players
FC Slutsk players
FK Utenis Utena players
FC Torpedo Minsk players
FC Mauerwerk players
Belarusian expatriate sportspeople in Austria